Yaroslav Bykovets (born Chernihiv 6 February 1984) is a Ukrainian professional footballer who plays as a midfielder.

Career
Bykovets is a product of Desna Chernihiv. In 2005 he was included in the main squad of the club where he played 16 matches where he won the Ukrainian Second League in the season 2005–06. In 2007 he moved to Arsenal Bila Tserkva where he played 9 matches and then in 2008 he played 2 matches with Yednist Plysky 2. In the winter transfer window he moved to Sevastopol-2 in Ukrainian Second League where he played 21 matches and scored 1 goal in the season season 2008–09. In 2011 he played 2 matches with Avanhard Koryukivka and then in 2012 he moved to YSB Chernihiv where he won the Chernihiv Oblast Football Cup.

Honours
YSB Chernihiv
 Chernihiv Oblast Football Cup: 2012

Avanhard Koryukivka
 Chernihiv Oblast Football Cup: 2011

Desna Chernihiv
 Ukrainian Second League: 2005–06

References

External links
 Биковець Ярослав Миколайович at Foofballfact.ru 
 Yaroslav Bykovets at upl.ua 

1984 births
Living people
Footballers from Chernihiv
SDYuShOR Desna players
FC Chernihiv players
FC Desna Chernihiv players
FC Avanhard Koriukivka players
FC Sokil Zolochiv players
FC Arsenal-Kyivshchyna Bila Tserkva players
FC Yednist Plysky players
Ukrainian footballers
Association football midfielders
Ukrainian First League players